Concepción Peña Pastor (Ciudad Real, November 9, 1906 - Panama, October 15, 1960) was a professor, graduated in Philosophy, Law, Medicine, Doctor of Law, polyglot, lecturer. 

She fought for women's suffrage and for women's rights. Exiled in Panama, she was a professor at the University of Civil Law (1941-1942) and Roman Law (1942 -1944) and deputy director of the National Library (1951), where she was involved in the recovery of the works of prominent politicians, intellectuals, writers, philosophers and artists.

References

1906 births
1960 deaths
People from Ciudad Real
20th-century women lawyers
Spanish suffragists
Spanish emigrants to Panama